Longás  (in Aragonese: Longars) is a municipality located in the Cinco Villas comarca, province of Zaragoza, Aragon, Spain. According to the 2004 census (INE), the municipality has a population of 53 inhabitants.

References

External links 

 Longás site
 Longás Tourism
 Longás - Gran Enciclopedia Aragonesa
 Hiking to the Santo Domingo summit
 Longás in comarca Cinco Villas

Municipalities in the Province of Zaragoza